Maryburgh is a village in the Highland council area of Scotland,  south of Dingwall. It is situated on the northern bank of the River Conon. The village of Conon Bridge is on the other side of the river.

Amenities

Maryburgh has a number of amenities within its bounds. There is a small shop and community centre. There is also two playgrounds and a large football field. The community council publishes a magazine for the community, titled the Maryburgh Roundabout.

Art
Maryburgh has a thriving art scene with notable artists including Michael Forbes and Kyle Maclennan, the founder of Headon Art.

See also 
Maryburgh is also an antiquated name for Fort William.

References

External links 
The Maryburgh Hub - Maryburgh Amenities Centre and Maryburgh Community Council Website

Populated places in Ross and Cromarty
Populated places established in 1815
1815 establishments in Scotland